The following tables show state-by-state results in the Australian House of Representatives at the 2013 federal election, Coalition 90, Labor 55, Australian Greens 1, Palmer United Party 1, Katter's Australian Party 1, with 2 independents.

Australia

Preference flows
 Greens − Labor 83.0% (+4.2) to Coalition 17.0% (−4.2) 
 Palmer − Coalition 53.7% to Labor 46.3%
 Family First − Coalition 58.3% (−1.5) to Labor 41.7% (+1.5)
 Katter − Coalition 54.0% to Labor 46.0%
 Independent candidates − Labor 57.1% (+13.6) to Coalition 42.9% (−13.6)

New South Wales

Labor to Liberal: Banks, Barton, Eden-Monaro, Lindsay, Reid, Robertson

Labor to National: Page

Independent to Liberal: Dobell (Labor at last election)

Independent to National: Lyne, New England

Victoria

Independents: Cathy McGowan

Labor to Liberal: Corangamite, Deakin, La Trobe

Liberal to Independent: Indi

Queensland

Labor to LNP: Capricornia, Petrie

LNP to Palmer United: Fairfax

Western Australia

WA National to Liberal: O'Connor

South Australia

Labor to Liberal: Hindmarsh

Tasmania

Independents: Andrew Wilkie

Labor to Liberal: Bass, Braddon, Lyons

Territories

Australian Capital Territory

Northern Territory

See also
 2013 Australian federal election
 Results of the 2013 Australian federal election (Senate)
 Post-election pendulum for the 2013 Australian federal election
 Members of the Australian House of Representatives, 2013–2016

References

2013 elections in Australia
House of Representatives 2013
Australian House of Representatives